East Hall (also known as the Florida Industrial School for Girls) is an historic one-story redbrick building located at 307 Southeast 26th Terrace in Ocala, Florida, United States. It is located on the grounds of the Marion County McPherson Governmental Complex. Designed by architect Frank Parzaile, it was built in 1936 by the Public Works Administration. On July 28, 1995, it was added to the U.S. National Register of Historic Places. It is home to the Marion County Museum of History and Archaeology.

History
The Florida Industrial School for Girls was a reclamation school for delinquent females in Ocala, Florida. The state legislature first established the school in 1915, and was opened in 1917. The industrial school originally accepted girls from nine to seventeen years of age, but later accepted only those ages twelve to seventeen.  No pregnant females were allowed. They were trained in home economics as well as traditional school curricula. In 1995, it was listed on the National Register of Historic Places.

Marion County Museum
East Hall is home to the Marion County Museum of History and Archaeology, which features antiques and artifacts of local history.

References

External links

 Marion County Museum of History and Archaeology
 Marion County listings at National Register of Historic Places
 Marion County listings at Florida's Office of Cultural and Historical Programs

Buildings and structures in Ocala, Florida
National Register of Historic Places in Marion County, Florida
Museums in Marion County, Florida
History museums in Florida
Works Progress Administration in Florida